Glinki  is a village in the administrative district of Gmina Radziłów, within Grajewo County, Podlaskie Voivodeship, in northeastern Poland.

References

Glinki